The 1962 British Grand Prix was a Formula One motor race held at Aintree on 21 July 1962. It was race 5 of 9 in both the 1962 World Championship of Drivers and the 1962 International Cup for Formula One Manufacturers. This was the last race at Aintree. From 1963 onwards, the race would be held at Silverstone. Scotsman Jim Clark dominated the race, driving a Lotus 25. It was considered a power track, benefitting the light and powerful Lotus and Lola cars in particular. Ferrari were still sidelined due to the Italian metal workers' strike but managed to send one car for Phil Hill.

Race
It was not a particularly exciting race, with Clark leading from start to finish and fairly large gaps between the cars. Out of the twentyone starters, six still had four-cylinder engines while the rest were multi-cylinder cars. These cars were in a sort of class of their own, with Jackie Lewis finishing best of the four-cylinder cars. John Surtees' Lola started and finished in second place, in spite of having lost second gear on the tenth lap. Dan Gurney was hopeful after winning in France and at the non-championship Solitude race in the preceding two weeks. He began the race in third but had a slipping clutch and slid steadily down the field, ending in ninth position. His teammate Jo Bonnier had to retire with a broken transmission. Bruce McLaren (Cooper) passed Gurney after twelve laps and finished in third. Graham Hill pushed his BRM hard but had to settle for fourth, and was threatened by Jack Brabham in the closing stages. Brabham, however, had burns on his right foot since lap 40 and was in a lot of pain. He finished fifth, ahead of Tony Maggs' Cooper. Brabham had hoped to start in his own car after his mechanics had worked days and nights, but at 3 am the morning before the race it was discovered that they had been supplied with the wrong exhaust system. The Brabham BT3 had to wait until Nürburgring two weeks later to make its first appearance.

Innes Ireland had perhaps the day's biggest disappointment. After having qualified his Climax-engined UDT/Laystall Lotus 24 on the first row, the gear shifter bent on his first lap, leaving him with only three gears. He had to pit immediately after start and finished last, after having spent several laps repairing the car. Trevor Taylor was anxious to have a good race after several recent collisions and started well. Soon, however, he had to pit with a loose carburettor, and only managed an eighth place in his Lotus 24. Phil Hill's Ferrari, meanwhile, was totally outclassed by the British cars in spite of its new six-speed gearbox. He never ran higher than tenth and had to retire with ignition troubles.

Classification

Qualifying

Race

 Scuderia Ferrari withdrew their other two entries, cars #4 and #6, to which drivers had not been allocated.

Championship standings after the race

Drivers' Championship standings

Constructors' Championship standings

 Notes: Only the top five positions are included for both sets of standings.

References

British Grand Prix
British Grand Prix
Grand Prix
July 1962 sports events in the United Kingdom